Sami Güçlü (born September 6, 1950, Konya, Turkey), is a Turkish politician. He is a founding member of the Justice and Development Party. He was the Minister of Agriculture and Rural Affairs in the cabinet of Abdullah Gül and the first cabinet of Recep Tayyip Erdogan.

External links 
 Sami Güçlü biography, biyografya.com.

1950 births
Living people
Government ministers of Turkey
Deputies of Konya
Justice and Development Party (Turkey) politicians
Agriculture ministers
Members of the 23rd Parliament of Turkey
Members of the 22nd Parliament of Turkey